Rasmus Levin Martinsen (born 14 April 1996) is a Norwegian footballer who plays as a right-back for Hinna Fotball.

Career
He made his league debut as a substitute against Odd in September 2014.

After the 2018 season, Viking did not renew Martinsen's contract and thus he left the club. On 6 April 2019, Martinsen signed for 3. divisjon club IL Brodd.

Career statistics

References

External links
Rasmus Martinsen at NFF

1996 births
Living people
Sportspeople from Stavanger
Norwegian footballers
Norway youth international footballers
Viking FK players
IL Brodd players
Hinna Fotball players
Eliteserien players
Norwegian First Division players
Norwegian Third Division players
Norwegian Fourth Division players
Association football defenders